Schmitt Music is an American retail company which specializes in acoustic pianos, digital pianos, band and orchestra instruments, guitars and other musical instruments, sheet music and accessories, as well as offering services such as instrument repair and music instruction.  The company operates thirteen stores in six states. Founded in 1896 as the Paul A. Schmitt Music Company, it was awarded the Steinway & Sons Partners in Performance Award in 2003, and the Steinway & Sons "Dealer of the Year" in 2011.  Schmitt Music was named Kawai Dealer of the Year in 2012.

Locations 
Schmitt Music currently operates 13 stores in 6 states throughout the midwest.

 Bloomington, Minnesota (headquarters)
 Anoka, Minnesota
 Apple Valley, Minnesota
 Brooklyn Center, Minnesota 
 Denver, Colorado
 Duluth, Minnesota
 Eau Claire, Wisconsin
 Fargo, North Dakota
 Omaha, Nebraska
 Rochester, Minnesota
 Sioux Falls, South Dakota
 Virginia, Minnesota
 Woodbury, Minnesota

History 
Schmitt Music was founded by Paul A. Schmitt in 1896 in Minneapolis, Minnesota as a print music retail company. In the 1930s, the company expanded its inventory to include a full line of musical instruments, radios, records and other accessories. The downtown Minneapolis store location moved to South 10th Street in 1939, which is the location of the now-iconic Schmitt Music Wall mural.

In the early 1970s, many Minneapolis businesses were making efforts to beautify the city. Journalist Barbara Flanagan of the Minneapolis Star suggested that the large wall be painted with big and colorful notes. President Robert P. Schmitt agreed. The wall is painted with "Scarbo" a section of "Gaspard de la Nuit" by Maurice Ravel. The mural was completed in 1972, and was famously used as a backdrop for promotional photos for Prince in 1977.

The company headquarters moved to Brooklyn Center, Minnesota in 2001 and later to  Bloomington, Minnesota in 2022, where it is currently located.

References

External links
Tom Schmitt Interview NAMM Oral History Library (2013)
Schmitt Music Company History Schmitt Music Website

Retail companies established in 1896
Music education organizations
Musical instrument retailers of the United States
1896 establishments in Minnesota